In mathematics,  Atkin–Lehner theory is part of the theory of modular forms describing when they arise at a given integer level N in such a way that the theory of Hecke operators can be extended to higher levels.

Atkin–Lehner theory is based on the concept of a newform, which is a cusp form 'new' at a given level N, where the levels are the nested congruence subgroups:

of the modular group, with N ordered by divisibility. That is, if M divides N,  Γ0(N) is a subgroup of Γ0(M). The oldforms for Γ0(N) are those modular forms f(τ) of level N of the form g(d τ) for modular forms g of level M with M a proper divisor of N, where d divides N/M. The newforms are defined as a vector subspace of the modular forms of level N, complementary to the space spanned by the oldforms, i.e. the orthogonal space with respect to the Petersson inner product.

The Hecke operators, which act on the space of all cusp forms, preserve the subspace of newforms and are self-adjoint and commuting operators (with respect to the Petersson inner product) when restricted to this subspace. Therefore, the algebra of operators on newforms they generate is a finite-dimensional C*-algebra that is commutative; and by the spectral theory of such operators, there exists a basis for the space of newforms consisting of eigenforms for the full Hecke algebra.

Atkin–Lehner involutions
Consider a Hall divisor e of N, which means that not only does e divide N, but also e and N/e are relatively prime (often denoted e||N). If N has s distinct prime divisors, there are 2s Hall divisors of N; for example, if N = 360 = 23⋅32⋅51, the 8 Hall divisors of N are 1, 23, 32, 51, 23⋅32, 23⋅51, 32⋅51, and 23⋅32⋅51.

For each Hall divisor e of N, choose an integral matrix We of the form 

with det We = e. These matrices have the following properties:
 The elements We normalize Γ0(N): that is, if A is in Γ0(N), then WeAW is in Γ0(N).
 The matrix W, which has determinant e2, can be written as eA where A is in Γ0(N). We will be interested in operators on cusp forms coming from the action of We on Γ0(N) by conjugation, under which both the scalar e and the matrix A act trivially. Therefore, the equality W = eA implies that the action of We squares to the identity; for this reason, the resulting operator is called an Atkin–Lehner involution.
 If e and f are both Hall divisors of N, then We and Wf commute modulo Γ0(N). Moreover, if we define g to be the Hall divisor g = ef/(e,f)2, their product is equal to Wg modulo Γ0(N).
 If we had chosen a different matrix W ′e instead of We, it turns out that We ≡ W ′e modulo Γ0(N), so We and W ′e would determine the same Atkin–Lehner involution.
We can summarize these properties as follows. Consider the subgroup of GL(2,Q) generated by Γ0(N) together with the matrices We; let Γ0(N)+ denote its quotient by positive scalar matrices. Then Γ0(N) is a normal subgroup of Γ0(N)+ of index 2s (where s is the number of distinct prime factors of N); the quotient group is isomorphic to (Z/2Z)s and acts on the cusp forms via the Atkin–Lehner involutions.

References

Mocanu, Andreea. (2019). "Atkin-Lehner Theory of Γ1(m)-Modular Forms"

 Koichiro Harada (2010) "Moonshine" of Finite Groups, page 13, European Mathematical Society  

Modular forms